was a Japanese Nippon Professional Baseball pitcher. He played with the Yokohama Taiyo Whales.

External links

Japan Baseball Daily

Living people
1967 births
People from Kumamoto
Japanese baseball players
Yokohama Taiyō Whales players
Chiba Lotte Marines players
Hiroshima Toyo Carp players
Chunichi Dragons players
Osaka Kintetsu Buffaloes players